Unconventional myosin-Ia is a protein that in humans is encoded by the MYO1A gene.

The protein encoded by this gene belongs to the myosin superfamily. Myosins are molecular motors that, upon interaction with actin filaments, utilize energy from ATP hydrolysis to generate mechanical force. Each myosin has a conserved N-terminal motor domain that contains both ATP-binding and actin-binding sequences. Following the motor domain is a light-chain-binding 'neck' region containing 1-6 copies of a repeat element, the IQ motif, that serves as a binding site for calmodulin or other members of the EF-hand superfamily of calcium-binding proteins. At the C-terminus, each myosin class has a distinct tail domain that serves in dimerization, membrane binding, protein binding, and/or enzymatic activities and targets each myosin to its particular subcellular location. The myosin-Ia protein is expressed by enterocytes, the epithelial cells that line the luminal surface of the small intestine.  In these cells the myosin-1a protein localizes specifically to the brush border.  Experiments indicate that the brush border population of the encoded protein turns over rapidly, while its head and tail domains interact transiently with the core actin and plasma membrane, respectively. A rapidly exchanging pool of the unconventional myosin-Ia protein binds to the actin core bundle, which turns over on a much slower timescale.

References

Further reading